The 2010 UMass Minutemen football team represented the University of Massachusetts Amherst in the 2010 NCAA Division I FCS football season as a member of the Colonial Athletic Association.  The team was coached by Kevin Morris and played its home games at Warren McGuirk Alumni Stadium in Hadley, Massachusetts.  The Minutemen played their road opener on September 18 against the Michigan Wolverines at Michigan Stadium in a game that drew the largest crowd ever to attend a UMass football game.  UMass also played their first game in program history at Gillette Stadium, their future home beginning in 2012, on October 23 in the Colonial Clash against New Hampshire.  The team finished with a record of 6–5, 4–4 in CAA play.

Schedule

Roster

References

UMass
UMass Minutemen football seasons
UMass Minutemen football